Optomerus is a genus of beetles in the family Cerambycidae. The genus contains the following species:

 Optomerus bispeculifer (White, 1855)
 Optomerus roppai (Magno, 1995)

References

Rhinotragini